The banded pipefish or ringed pipefish (Dunckerocampus dactyliophorus) is a species of fish in the Syngnathidae (seahorses and pipefish) family.

Distribution and habitat
The banded pipefish is widespread throughout the tropical waters of the Indo-Pacific region, Red Sea included. Its range includes Australia, Fiji, French Polynesia, Indonesia, Japan, the Marshall Islands, New Caledonia, Northern Mariana Islands, Papua New Guinea, the Philippines, Samoa, the Solomon Islands, South Africa, and Taiwan. It inhabits tide pools, lagoons, and outer reef slopes in tropical climates.

Description
The banded pipefish has a straight, elongated body which reaches a maximum length of 19 cm (7.4 in). It has fleshy streams coming back from its head. These trails are thought to be mechanisms of camouflage for the pipefish whilst hiding in reeds.

Reproduction
Similar to the other seahorses and pipefishes, the male banded pipefish is equipped with a specialised brood pouch, rather than the female. The female deposits her eggs in the male's pouch, where they develop. The male later gives birth.

References

External links
http://www.marinespecies.org/aphia.php?p=taxdetails&id=218005
http://doris.ffessm.fr/fiche2.asp?fiche_numero=2319
Fishes of Australia : Dunckerocampus dactyliophorus
 

banded pipefish
Marine fish of Northern Australia
banded pipefish
Taxonomy articles created by Polbot